Elsa la rose  is a 1965 short documentary film by Agnès Varda about the love between Elsa Triolet and Louis Aragon.

Summary
The documentary films the two writers, telling their story and their memories, from Elsa Triolet's youth to when she met with Louis Aragon, whilst an voice (Michel Piccoli) reads Aragon's poems about Elsa.

Cast 

 Elsa Triolet as herself
 Louis Aragon as himself
 Michel Piccoli as the voice-over

Development
The film was shot in Elsa and Louis' home in Saint-Arnoult-en-Yvelines and in the Bar du dôme at Montparnasse during June 1965.

Release
The film is shot during the year 1965, but was only first seen on television on 23 Octobre 1966 during a show called “Dim Dam Dom” on ORTF second channel.

References

External links
 
 
 Elsa la rose on Vimeo

1966 films
1966 short films
French documentary films
Documentary films about women writers
1960s French-language films
Films directed by Agnès Varda
Films shot in France
1960s French films